Charlie Lovett (born 1962 in Winston-Salem, NC) is a bestselling novelist, bibliophile, podcast producer, children's playwright and expert on both the works and the life of Lewis Carroll.  He has the world's largest collection of Carollean memorabilia and was twice president of the Lewis Carroll Society of North America.

Life and career
Charlie Lovett was born in Winston-Salem, North Carolina in 1962. He got a B.A. in theatre at Davidson College in 1984 and then went into the antiquarian book business and became interested in the works of Lewis Carroll.  He got a Master of Fine Arts degree in writing at Vermont College of Fine Arts in 1997.  In 2003 he became a member of the Grolier Club the oldest and largest club for bibliophiles in North America.

Two of his books draw on his own experience as an antiquarian bibliophile: The Bookman’s Tale and First Impressions: A Novel of Old Books, Unexpected Love, and Jane Austen. The Bookman’s Tale made the New York Times best seller list. In 1999 he wrote Love, Ruth: A Son's Memoir about his mother Ruth Cander Lovett who was the great-granddaughter of Asa Griggs Candler the founder of Coca-Cola; Maya Angelou called this book "tender and sensitive and true." More than 5000 productions of his children's plays have been performed all over the world.

He hosts the podcast "Inside the Writer’s Studio."

Lewis Carroll
After graduation from Davidson in 1984 Charlie Lovett was captivated by the works of Lewis Carroll, especially Alice’s Adventures in Wonderland. He began collecting Carrollian memorabilia and did research which led him to write five books about Carroll and to serve as president of the Lewis Carroll Society of North America. He has lectured on Carroll all over the world including at Oxford University, Harvard and UCLA.

Lovett has an enormous collection of Carrollian literature, all documented in a book he wrote in 1990 with his first wife Stephanie.  In 1994, he and Stephanie, who also served twice as president of Lewis Carroll Society, hosted The Second International Lewis Carroll Conference, in Winston-Salem. This resulted in a book, Proceedings of The Second International Lewis Carroll Conference, which he edited.

In 2015 he wrote a new introduction for Penguin Classics’s 150th anniversary edition of Alice’s Adventures in Wonderland and Through the Looking-Glass. That same year he curated Alice Live!, a major exhibition of Lewis Carroll and Alice memorabilia at the 
New York Public Library for the Performing Arts at Lincoln Center.

Foundation
In 1992 Charlie founded the Lovett Foundation which is dedicated to independent thinking in pursuit of a culturally diverse, rational and harmonious society. He and his second wife Janice are on the board.

Selected works
 Non-fiction
 Lewis Carroll Among His Books: A Descriptive Catalogue of the Private Library of Charles L. Dodgson, 
 Lewis Carroll and the Press, Oak Knoll/The British Library, (1999), as "Charles Lovett", 
 Alice on Stage, Meckler (1990), 
 Lewis Carroll's Alice: An Annotated Checklist of the Lovett Collection, Meckler (1990), with Stephanie Lovett, 
 Proceedings of the second International Lewis Carroll Conference, Winston-Salem, North Carolina, June 9–12, 1994, 
 Sparrow Through the Hall: A Pilgrimage Through British Christianity, Kingham Tree (2002), 
 Everybody's Guide to Book Collecting, Write Brain (1993), 
 Lewis Carroll's England, White Stone Publishing (1998), 
 Alice’s Adventures in Wonderland and Through the Looking-Glass, 150Th-Anniversary Edition (Penguin Classics Deluxe Edition) By Lewis Carroll, Illustrated by John Tenniel, Introduction by Charlie Lovett, 
 Love, Ruth: A Son's Memoir, Callanwolde Guild (1999), 

 Novels
 First Impressions, 
 Escaping Dreamland: A Novel, 
 The Program, 
 The Bookman’s Tale, 
 The Lost Book of the Grail, 
 The Further Adventures of Ebenezer Scrooge, 
 The Fat Lady Sings, 

 Children's plays
 Becoming Shakespeare
 The Emperor’s Birthday Suit
 Frogspell
 A Hairy Tale
 Hairy Tale Rock
 Little Miss Gingerbread
 Porridgegate
 A Super Groovy Night’s Dream
 Supercomics
 Twinderella
 Twinderella — The Musical

References

External links
 Official website
 Books by Charles Lovett ISBNS.tw Taiwan

Lewis Carroll
Davidson College alumni
Vermont College of Fine Arts alumni
American writers
American dramatists and playwrights
Writers from Winston-Salem, North Carolina
1962 births
Living people